Vaccinium vitis-idaea, the lingonberry, partridgeberry, mountain cranberry or cowberry, is a small evergreen shrub in the heath family Ericaceae, that bears edible fruit. It is native to boreal forest and Arctic tundra throughout the Northern Hemisphere, from Europe and Asia to North America. Lingonberries are picked in the wild and used to accompany a variety of dishes in Northern Baltoscandia, Russia, Canada and Alaska. Commercial cultivation is undertaken in the U.S. Pacific Northwest and in many other regions of the world.

Names
Vaccinium vitis-idaea is most commonly known in English as 'lingonberry' or 'cowberry'. The name 'lingonberry' originates from the Swedish name  for the species, and is derived from the Norse , or heather.

The genus name Vaccinium is a classical Latin name for a plant, possibly the bilberry or hyacinth, and may be derived from the Latin , 'berry'.

There are at least 25 other common English names of Vaccinium vitis-idaea worldwide, including:

Description

Vaccinium vitis-idaea spreads by underground stems to form dense clonal colonies. Slender and brittle roots grow from the underground stems.

While bitter early in the season, they sweeten if left on the branch through winter.

Conservation status in the United States
The plant is endangered in Michigan. The minus subspecies is listed as a species of special concern and believed extirpated in Connecticut.

Ecology
Vaccinium vitis-idaea keeps its leaves all winter even in the coldest years, unusual for a broad-leaved plant, though in its natural habitat it is usually protected from severe cold by snow cover. It prefers some shade (as from a forest canopy) and constantly moist, acidic soil. Nutrient-poor soils are tolerated but not alkaline soils.

Varieties

There are two regional varieties or subspecies of V. vitis-idaea, one in Eurasia and one in North America, differing in leaf size:
V. vitis-idaea var. vitis-idaea L. — syn. V. vitis-idaea subsp. vitis-idaea.Cowberry. Eurasia.
V. vitis-idaea var. minus Lodd. — syn. V. vitis-idaea subsp. minus (Lodd.) Hultén.Lingonberry. North America.

Cultivation
Lingonberry has been commercially cultivated in the Netherlands and other countries since the 1960s. Empress Elizabeth ordered lingonberry to be planted all over Peterhof in 1745.

Some cultivars are grown for their ornamental rather than culinary value. In the United Kingdom, the Koralle Group has gained the Royal Horticultural Society's Award of Garden Merit.

Culinary uses

The berries collected in the wild are a popular fruit in northern, central and eastern Europe, notably in Nordic countries, the Baltic states, central and northern Europe. In some areas, they can be picked legally on both public and private lands in accordance with the freedom to roam.

The berries are quite tart, so they are often cooked and sweetened before eating in the form of lingonberry jam, compote, juice, smoothie or syrup. The raw fruits are also frequently simply mashed with sugar, which preserves most of their nutrients and taste. This mix can be stored at room temperature in closed but not necessarily sealed containers, but in this condition, they are best preserved frozen. Fruit served this way or as compote often accompanies game and liver dishes.

In Sweden, Finland and Norway, reindeer and elk steaks are traditionally served with gravy and lingonberry sauce. Preserved fruit is commonly eaten with meatballs, as well as potato pancakes. This was very common in old times, because it was an easy and tasty way to preserve pears. In Sweden and Russia, when sugar was still a luxury item, the berries were usually preserved simply by putting them whole into bottles of water. This was also a home remedy against scurvy.

This traditional Russian soft drink, known as "lingonberry water", is mentioned by Alexander Pushkin in Eugene Onegin. In Russian folk medicine, lingonberry water was used as a mild laxative. A traditional Finnish dish is sautéed reindeer with mashed potatoes and lingonberries on the side, either raw, thawed or as a jam. In Finland, whipped semolina pudding flavored with lingonberry is also popular. In Poland, the berries are often mixed with pears to create a sauce served with poultry or game. The berries can also be used to replace redcurrants when creating Cumberland sauce.

The berries are also popular as a wild picked fruit in Eastern Canada, for example in Newfoundland and Labrador and Cape Breton, where they are locally known as partridgeberries or redberries, and on the mainland of Nova Scotia, where they are known as foxberries. In this region they are incorporated into jams, syrups, and baked goods, such as pies, scones, and muffins.

In Sweden lingonberries are often sold as jam and juice, and as a key ingredient in dishes. They are used to make Lillehammer berry liqueur; and, in East European countries, lingonberry vodka is sold, and vodka with lingonberry juice or mors is a popular cocktail.

The berries are an important food for bears and foxes, and many fruit-eating birds. Caterpillars of the case-bearer moths Coleophora glitzella, Coleophora idaeella and Coleophora vitisella are obligate feeders on V. vitis-idaea leaves.

In Indigenous North American cuisine
Alaska natives mix the berries with rose hip pulp and sugar to make jam, cook the berries as a sauce, and store the berries for future use. The Dakelh use the berries to make jam. The Koyukon freeze the berries for winter use. Inuit dilute and sweeten the juice to make a beverage, freeze and store the berries for spring, and use the berries to make jams and jellies. The Iñupiat use the berries to make two different desserts, one in which the berries are whipped with frozen fish eggs and eaten, and one in which raw berries are mashed with canned milk and seal oil. They also make a dish of the berries cooked with fish eggs, fish (whitefish, sheefish or pike) and blubber.

The Upper Tanana boil the berries with sugar and flour to thicken; eat the raw berries, either plain or mixed with sugar, grease or a combination of the two; fry them in grease with sugar or dried fish eggs; or make them into pies, jam, and jelly. They also preserve the berries alone or in grease and store them in a birchbark basket in an underground cache, or freeze them.

Use of the minus subspecies
The Anticosti people use the fruit to make jams and jellies. The Nihithawak Cree store the berries by freezing them outside during the winter, mix the berries with boiled fish eggs, livers, air bladders and fat and eat them, eat the berries raw as a snack food, or stew them with fish or meat. The Iñupiat of Nelson Island eat the berries, as do the Iñupiat of the Northern Bering Sea and Arctic regions of Alaska, as well as the Inuvialuit. The Haida people, Hesquiaht First Nation, Wuikinuxv and Tsimshian all use the berries as food.

Nutrition

Raw lingonberries are 86% water, 13% carbohydrates, 1% protein, and contain negligible fat. In a 100 gram (3.5 oz) reference amount, lingonberries supply 228 calories, and are low-to-moderate sources of vitamin C, B vitamins, and dietary minerals.

Traditional medicine
In traditional medicine, V. vitis-idaea was used as an apéritif and astringent. The Upper Tanana ate the berries or used their juice to treat minor respiratory disorders.

Other uses
The Nihithawak Cree use the berries of the minus subspecies to color porcupine quills, and put the firm, ripe berries on a string to wear as a necklace. The Western Canadian Inuit use the minus subspecies as a tobacco additive or substitute.

Related species
Vaccinium vitis-idaea differs from the related cranberries in having white flowers with petals partially enclosing the stamens and stigma, rather than pink flowers with petals reflexed backwards, and rounder, less pear-shaped berries.

Hybrids between Vaccinium vitis-idaea and Vaccinium myrtillus, named Vaccinium × intermedium Ruthe, are occasionally found in Europe.

References

vitis-idaea
Alpine flora
Berries
Flora of Europe
Flora of Subarctic America
Flora of temperate Asia
Least concern plants
Least concern flora of North America
Least concern flora of the United States
Plants described in 1753
Taxa named by Carl Linnaeus
Japanese fruit
Plants used in Native American cuisine
Plants used in traditional Native American medicine
Groundcovers
Subshrubs
Flora of Western Canada
Flora of Eastern Canada
Flora of the Northeastern United States
Flora of Minnesota
Flora of Wisconsin